Pomaderris pilifera is a species of flowering plant in the family Rhamnaceae and is endemic to south-eastern Australia. It is a shrub with hairy branchlets, egg-shaped leaves, and large panicles of lemon-yellow flowers.

Description
The upper surface of the leaves is more or less glabrous, the lower surface densely covered with soft, star-shaped hairs. Flowering occurs in September and October and the fruit is a hairy capsule.

Taxonomy
Pomaderris pilifera was first formally described in 1951 by Norman Arthur Wakefield in The Victorian Naturalist from specimens he collected near the Snowy River Victoria in 1947. The specific epithet (pilifera) means "bearing hairs".

In 2007, Alan Maurice Gray and Mark Wapstra described two subspecies of P. pilifera in the journal Muelleria, and the names are accepted by the Australian Plant Census:
 Pomaderris pilifera N.A.Wakef. subsp. pilifera;
 Pomaderris pilifera subsp. talpicutica A.M.Gray & Wapstra that differs from the autonym in having leaves densely covered on the upper surface with dull grey, velvety, star-shaped hairs and a small notch at the tip of the leaves. The epithet talpicutica means "moleskin", referring to the soft layer of hairs on the upper surface of the leaves.

Distribution and habitat
This pomaderris grows in forest and woodland, usually near watercourses and occurs from the south coast of New South Wales to north-east Victoria and on the low hills of the Derwent River estuary. Subspecies talpicutica is only known from three small populations in heathy and shrubby woodlands near East Risdon and Boyer.

Conservation status
Subspecies talpicutica is listed as "vulnerable" under the Australian Government Environment Protection and Biodiversity Conservation Act 1999 and the Tasmanian Government Threatened Species Protection Act 1995. The main threats to the species are forestry operations, inappropriate fire regimes and woody weed invasion.

References

Flora of New South Wales
Flora of Victoria (Australia)
Flora of Tasmania
pilifera
Plants described in 1951
Taxa named by Norman Arthur Wakefield